John Frederick Tasman Hassell (24 June 1839 – 15 February 1919) was an Australian pastoralist and politician who served in both houses of the Parliament of Western Australia. He was a member of the Legislative Council from 1893 to 1894 and later served in the Legislative Assembly from 1900 to 1901.

Hassell was born in Launceston, Tasmania, to Ellen (née Boucher) and John Hassell. His family moved to Albany, Western Australia, when he was an infant, where his younger brother Albert Hassell (who was also a member of parliament) was born. In 1856, Hassell became manager of his father's property at Kendenup. He returned to Albany in 1864 and went into partnership with his brother, establishing a business there. He also worked as an agent for P&O, a steamship company. From 1865 to 1866, Hassell served on the Albany Town Trust. He also served on the Plantagenet Road Board for a period. Hassell entered parliament in August 1893, as a nominee of the governor, Sir William Robinson, to the Legislative Council. He served until July 1894, when the council became fully elective. Hassell re-entered parliament at the 1900 Albany by-election, replacing George Leake (who had resigned) in the seat of Albany. He served only until the 1901 state election, which he did not contest. Hassell died in Albany in 1919, aged 79. He had married Isabella Johanna Morison in 1868, with whom he had five daughters.

References

1839 births
1919 deaths
Australian pastoralists
Members of the Western Australian Legislative Assembly
Members of the Western Australian Legislative Council
People from Albany, Western Australia
Politicians from Launceston, Tasmania
Western Australian local councillors
19th-century Australian businesspeople